Izmirlian Medical Center, is a medical center and a research foundation located in the Armenian capital Yerevan. Opened in 1986, it is located in the Kanaker-Zeytun district and currently operates under the supervision of the Mother See of Holy Etchmiadzin. The Surb Nerses Mets Research and Education Center, operates within the medical center.

History
The medical center-institute was originally opened in 1986 in the Nor Zeytun neighbourhood of Yerevan as a center of proctology named after L. Nazarov. Between 1998 and 2000, the center was redeveloped by the New York-based Armenian General Benevolent Union to include a section for plastic surgery and other surgical specialties. In 2000, the center was granted to the Mother See of Holy Etchmiadzin and renamed as Surb Nerses Mets Medical Center, after the Catholicos of All Armenians Nerses I of the 4 the century.

In 2013, the center was entirely redeveloped through donations from the Izmirlian Family Foundation. US$12 million has been allocated for the redevelopment process and the construction of a new building. The hospital of the center was renamed in honor of benefactor Dikran Izmirlian. Other Armenian benefactors from Brazil, United States and France have also contributed in the redevelopment of the center.

Services
With a capacity of 139 beds, currently the medical center-institute has 15 sections:
 Coloproctology
 General proctology
 Orthopedics and sports traumatology
 General and laparoscopic surgery
 Urology
 Otorhinolaryngology / Plastic, oral and maxillofacial surgery
 Endoscopy and reconstructive gynaecology
 Anesthesiology, rehabilitation and ICU
 Cardiac surgery
 Cardiothoracic surgery
 Vascular surgery
 Robot-assisted surgery
 Hematology
 Computerized axial tomography scan
 Magnetic resonance imaging
 Advisory diagnostic
 Laboratory

Researches in the center are mainly conducted in the fields of urology, proctology, gastroenterology, etc. The center also hosts several conferences in urology throughout the year.

References

Hospitals in Yerevan
Hospitals established in 1986